Turkey was represented by Seyyal Taner and Lokomotif at the 1987 Eurovision Song Contest, which took place in Brussels on 9 May 1987. Taner and her backing group won the rights to represent Turkey on the 21 February 1987.

Before Eurovision

11. Eurovision Şarkı Yarışması Türkiye Finali 
The final took place on 21 February 1987 at the TRT Studios in Ankara, hosted by television presenter and Turkish commentator Bülend Özveren. Ten songs competed and the winner was determined by a sixteen-member jury. 

Other participants included past and future Turkish representative MFÖ (1985, 1988), Arzu Ece (1989, 1995) and Kayahan (1990).

At Eurovision
On the night of the contest, Turkey performed 10th following Spain and preceding Greece. At the close of voting Turkey had received no points (or, as Eurovision fans refer to the phenomenon, nul points) placing Turkey last out of 22 entries. At the time this was the worst last placing for a country as it was the largest contest. This was also the third time Turkey came last in the contest and the second time they had received zero points. This is the final contest to date in which Turkey finished last.

Voting 
Turkey did not receive any points at the 1987 Eurovision Song Contest.

References

External links
  Turkish National Final 1987

1987
Countries in the Eurovision Song Contest 1987
Eurovision